Fante may refer to:
 Fante people, an Akan people from central southern coast of West Africa
 Fante dialect, a Niger-Congo language 
 Fante Confederacy, either the loose alliance of the Fante states in existence at least since the sixteenth century, or the Confederation formed in 1868 and dissolved in 1874
 John Fante (1909–1983), American writer
 Fante (playing card), the Jack in Italian playing cards
 , a class of destroyers of the Italian Navy in the 1970s

See also
Fanti, a surname

Language and nationality disambiguation pages